The International Court of Justice (ICJ) has accepted a request from the United Nations (UN) for an advisory opinion on the legal consequences arising from the policies and practices of Israel in the occupied Palestinian territory including East Jerusalem. The court has set 25 July 2023 for presentation of written statements and 25 October 2023 for subsequent written comments on the statements.

Background 
A draft motion prepared by the State of Palestine was approved by the Special Political and Decolonization Committee (Fourth Committee) on 11 November 2022. It was passed by a vote of 98 to 17, with 52 abstentions, and was sent to the General Assembly. Nicaragua presented the draft resolution because Palestine is not a full member of the UN.

On 30 December 2022, the UN General Assembly adopted the resolution with 87 votes in favor, Israel, the United States and 24 other members against, and 53 abstentions.

In a statement to the United Nations Security Council on 18 January, 2023, the chair of the Committee on the Exercise of the Inalienable Rights of the Palestinian People announced that in February 2023, the Committee would finalize its independent legal study on "The legality of the Israeli occupation of the Occupied Palestinian Territory, including East Jerusalem", commissioned in 2021.

On 20 January 2023, the ICJ confirmed "The request was transferred to the ICJ through a letter sent by the Secretary-General of the United Nations, Antonio Guterres, on January 17, and the request was registered yesterday, Thursday."

The resolution
Paragraph 18 of the resolution requests an opinion as follows:

"(a) What are the legal consequences arising from Israel’s ongoing violation of the right of the Palestinian people to self-determination, its prolonged occupation, settlement and annexation of the Palestinian Territory occupied since 1967, including measures aimed at altering the demographic composition, character and status of the Holy City of Jerusalem, and from its adoption of related discriminatory legislation and measures?"

"(b) How do Israel’s policies and practices referred to in paragraph (a) affect the legal status of the occupation and what are the legal consequences that arise for all States and the United Nations from this status?"

UN’s Special Political and Decolonization Committee vote

General Assembly vote

Reactions 
The resolution was hailed as "a diplomatic and legal success and achievement" according to Riyad Al-Maliki, the State of Palestine's Minister of Foreign Affairs. Al-Maliki expressed gratitude to the nations that supported the resolution by sponsoring it and voting in favor of it. He urged countries that did not support the resolution to "adhere to international law and avoid standing on the wrong side of history." Days prior to the final vote, in an attempt to impede the referral of the conflict to The Hague, Prime Minister Yair Lapid wrote to 50 countries urging them not to support it in the General Assembly.

The Organization of Islamic Cooperation (OIC) welcomed the resolution's approval by the General Assembly, "praising the positions of the countries that supported it, which confirms their commitment to international law and is consistent with their historical support for the Palestinian cause".

See also 
 Legal Consequences of the Construction of a Wall in the Occupied Palestinian Territory
 Seventy-seventh session of the United Nations General Assembly
 International law and the Arab–Israeli conflict
 Legality of the Israeli occupation of Palestine

External links 

 Full text of the resolution

References 

Israeli–Palestinian conflict and the United Nations
2022 in law
United Nations General Assembly resolutions
History of human rights
2022 in the United Nations
Human rights abuses in the State of Palestine